The Flat Rock Dam is a decommissioned hydroelectric gravity dam crossing the Huron River.  It is located in the city of Flat Rock in Wayne County in the U.S. state  of Michigan.  The dam was built by the Ford Motor Company in 1924 for hydroelectricity for the nearby Ford Motor Company Lamp Factory, which remained in operation until 1950.

Location
It is the last sizable dam along the  Huron River. The river remains unobstructed after the Huroc Dam. The reservoir has no official name but is generally referred to as the Flat Rock Pond or the Flat Rock Impoundment.

The dam itself is not accessible to the public, and a railway bridge mostly obscures the view of the dam.  While the reservoir is mostly inaccessible due to private land ownership and a lack of public access points, the area immediately south of the dam has been organized into a public park known as Huroc Park (sometimes spelled Hurock Park) on an artificially created island within the Huron River.  A pedestrian bridge leads to the island and crosses the very small Huroc Dam, which is sometimes erroneously referred to as the Flat Rock Dam itself.

The dam is currently owned by the Huron–Clinton Metropolitan Authority.  The Oakwoods Metropark division is located further upstream along a portion of the reservoir and is connected via trail to Huroc Park.

Fishing
The immediate downstream area of the Flat Rock Dam is very popular among shore fishermen.  The Michigan Department of Natural Resources stocks ten-of-thousands of rainbow trout along this stretch of river leading to Lake Erie.  While the majority of trout exit into the lake, some return to the area for spawning.  In 1997, a fish ladder was constructed at the dam to aid fish in spawning further upstream.  Other fish within the Huron River at this point include northern pike, walleye, large and smallmouth bass, silver bass, channel catfish, bluegill, sunfish, and black crappie. Coho salmon, tiger muskellunge, and sheephead can also be found leading to the lake.

The Flat Rock Impoundment has a single listing on the state's Master Angler Entries documented by the Michigan Department of Natural Resources.  The fish listed is a smallmouth bass measured at  caught and released in 2007.

Health concerns
The Huron River is occasionally issued a "Do Not Eat" fish advisory by the Michigan Department of Health and Human Services when the waters  
accumulate high levels of cyanobacteria and perfluorooctanesulfonatecan (PFOS). When this bacteria is present, prolonged contact with the water is not advised, although occasional contact with PFOS is not considered a health concern.  Fishermen are advised to catch and release only, and warning signs are posted at river access points.  While the Flat Rock Dam and its reservoir are usually not specifically mentioned, the advisory is often issued for long stretches of the Huron River that include the Flat Rock Dam portion leading to the river mouth at Lake Erie.

Gallery

References

Buildings and structures in Wayne County, Michigan
Dams in Michigan
Dams completed in 1924
Energy infrastructure completed in 1924
1924 establishments in Michigan
Huron River (Michigan)
Dams with fish ladders